is a village in Kunigami District, Okinawa Prefecture, Japan. It occupies the north tip of Okinawa Island, with the East China Sea to the west, Pacific Ocean to the east, and villages of Higashi and Ōgimi to the south.

As of 2015, the village has a population of 4,908 and a population density of 25.20 persons per km2. The total area is 194.80 km2.

History
According to Chūzan Seikan, the goddess Amamikyu consecrated the first utaki in Asa Forest at Hedo, in what is now Kunigami; the forest is also mentioned in Omoro Sōshi. Ceramics from the Jōmon-period  resemble those found in the Amami Islands. Chūzan Seikan records the prayers of the Kunigami council for the recovery of Shō Sei after an abortive attempt to occupy Amami Ōshima in 1537, while Kyūyō recounts the appointment of the son of the Kunigami Oyakata as aji after the successful takeover of the Amami Islands by Shō Gen in 1571.

Kunigami District was established in 1896 and, upon the abolition of Kunigami magiri, Kunigami Village was founded in 1908. During the Battle of Okinawa, the area saw an influx of refugees fleeing the heavy fighting in the south.

Geography
Kunigami is mountainous, with over 80% of the land area covered by subtropical evergreen forest. Endemic species include the Okinawa woodpecker and Okinawa rail.
 Mount Yonaha (503 m), the highest mountain on Okinawa Island
  (420 m)
  (395 m)
 
 
 
 Cape Hedo
 
 Camp Gonsalves
 Yanbaru National Park

Neighbouring municipalities
 Higashi
 Ōgimi

Climate

Demographics

Education
There is one municipal junior high school, Kunigami Junior High School (国頭中学校).

Kunigami has the following municipal elementary schools:
 Ada (安田小学校)
 Aha (安波小学校)
 Hentona (辺土名小学校)
 Oku (奥小学校)
 Okuma (奥間小学校)

The following municipal elementary schools are permanently closed:
Kitaguni Elementary School (北国小学校)
Sate Elementary School (佐手小学校)

There is one municipal kindergarten, Kunigami Nursery School (くにがみこども園).

See also

 Okinawa Yanbaru Seawater Pumped Storage Power Station
 Kunigami language
 Yanbaru

References

External links
 Kunigami official website 

 
Villages in Okinawa Prefecture